Wilson Alfredo Jones Rodríguez (19 May 1934 – 12 July 2021) was a Spanish professional footballer who played as a midfielder.

Career
Born in O Barco de Valdeorras, Jones played for Lérida, Alavés, Real Madrid, Zaragoza, Racing de Santander and Ourense.

References

1934 births
2021 deaths
Spanish footballers
UE Lleida players
Deportivo Alavés players
Real Madrid CF players
Real Zaragoza players
Racing de Santander players
CD Ourense footballers
Segunda División players
La Liga players
Association football midfielders
Sportspeople from the Province of Ourense